Dreka is a tiny unincorporated community in southeastern Shelby County, Texas, United States, southeast of Center, on Farm Road 2427.

Founded about 1890, a post office was established there in 1894 but was closed in 1907. Martin Shofner was the postmaster. In 1933 an estimated 25 people lived in the community, with one business. By 1946, a church a store and a gin were established, but by 1988 only the church remained.

In 1990, Dreka was still listed as a community.

External links
 

Unincorporated communities in Texas
Unincorporated communities in Shelby County, Texas